Stylianos "Stelios" Argyropoulos-Kanakakis (born 2 August 1996) is a Greek water polo player, who is a member of Greece men's national water polo team. He is part of Greece national team that competes at the 2017 World Aquatics Championships in Budapest. He started his career in Ethnikos, a club with great tradition in water polo. He was named best rookie of the Greek championship in 2015 and 2016. He then played for Greek powerhouse Olympiacos, with whom he won the 2017–18 LEN Champions League, 2 Greek Championships and 1 Greek Cup. He is currently a player of VK Jug.

Honours

Club
Olympiacos
 LEN Champions League: 2017–18 ;runners-up: 2018–19
Greek Championship: 2017–18, 2018–19, 2019–20, 2020–21
Greek Cup: 2017–18, 2018–19, 2019–20, 2020–21
Greek Super Cup : 2018, 2019, 2020
Jug Dubrovnik
Croatian Championship: 2021–22

Awards
Greek Championship Rookie of the Year 2014–15, 2015–16 with Ethnikos Piraeus
Olympic Tournament 2020 Tokyo Team of the Tournament
Member of the World Team  by totalwaterpolo: 2021

References

External links
 

Greek male water polo players
Olympiacos Water Polo Club players
Living people
1996 births
Mediterranean Games medalists in water polo
Mediterranean Games silver medalists for Greece
Competitors at the 2018 Mediterranean Games
Water polo players at the 2020 Summer Olympics
Medalists at the 2020 Summer Olympics
Olympic silver medalists for Greece
Olympic medalists in water polo
Olympic water polo players of Greece
Ethnikos Piraeus Water Polo Club players
World Aquatics Championships medalists in water polo